Pioneer Union Elementary School District can refer to one of several school districts within California:

Pioneer Union Elementary School District (Butte County) serving Berry Creek, California in Butte County
Pioneer Union Elementary School District (Kings County) serving Hanford, California in Kings County
Pioneer Union School District serving Somerset, California in El Dorado County